Alcoveria is an extinct genus of mawsoniid coelacanth fish which lived during the Triassic period.
Alcoveria is known from a well preserved specimen from Spain. It lived in a marine environment.

References 

Mawsoniidae
Prehistoric bony fish genera
Triassic bony fish
Fossils of Spain